Anne Howard or Ann Howard may refer to:

Anne of York, Lady Howard (1475–1511), English princess; daughter of Edward IV
Anne Howard, Countess of Arundel (1557–1630), English poet, noblewoman, and religious conspirator
Anne Howard, Countess of Effingham (1695–1774)
Anne Howard, Viscountess Irwin ( 1696–1764), poet
Anne Howard (actress) (1925–1991), American actress
Ann Howard (mezzo-soprano) (1934–2014), British opera singer
Ann Howard (author) (born 1942), Australian author and journalist

See also
Anne Fitzalan-Howard, Duchess of Norfolk (1927–2013), British peeress
Anna Howard (disambiguation)
Anne Howard Bailey (1924–2006), writer